Sure We Can is a non-profit redemption center and community hub based in Brooklyn, New York.

Services provided 
Sure We Can provides container-deposit redemption services to the Brooklyn, New York area. Any person can come to Sure We Can during business hours and redeem NY state accepted bottles and cans. Additionally, the organization serves as a community hub for the canner community that redeems there and for local environmental causes that promote the organizations dedication to sustainability.

History
Sure We Can (SWC) was founded in 2007 by a group led by Ana Martinez de Luco and Eugene Gadsden to serve the canning community of New York. The facility is designed with canners, the people who collect cans and bottles from the streets, in mind, aiming to provide a welcoming place they can redeem their cans and bottles. Sure We Can is the only non-profit, homeless-friendly redemption center in New York City. In 2019, the center annually processes 10 million cans and bottles for redemption, and serves a community of over 400 canners. Sure We Can estimates that they distribute $700,000 per year to canners. The average canner who visits Sure We Can earns $1000 per year.

Starting in 2020, Sure We Can faces eviction by their landlord, who is interested in selling the lot they have rented for 10 years. As of 2021, the organization is seeking funding from either the city or private donor to buy the land.

In 2021, Sure We Can worked with the Street Vendor Project to release a study documenting the impact of the COVID-19 pandemic in New York City on canners and street vendors, whose income dwindled during restrictions even as these informal workers were ineligible for government support. Sure We Can is a member of the Community Advisory Board of New York City's Test & Trace Corps.

Gallery

References

External links

Sure We Can
A Revolution Is Taking Place, One Can at a Time - Village Voice - March 2022

Environmental justice in New York City
Environmental organizations based in New York City
Recycling in New York City
Recycling in the United States
Recycling organizations
Waste management infrastructure of New York City
Environmental justice organizations
Sure We Can